Stuart Rindy (born May 22, 1964) is a former player in the National Football League for the Chicago Bears in 1987 as a tackle.

Rindy was born Stuart Eugene, in Milwaukee, Wisconsin.

See also
List of Chicago Bears players

References

Chicago Bears players
Wisconsin–Whitewater Warhawks football players
People from Milwaukee
1964 births
Living people
National Football League replacement players